Carl David Gutsche (March 21, 1921 – August 28, 2018) was an American chemist.

Gutsche was raised in La Grange Park, Illinois. He studied at Oberlin College and later earned a doctorate in organic chemistry from the University of Wisconsin. University taught at Washington University in St. Louis from 1947 to 1989, when he was appointed  Robert A. Welch Professor of Chemistry at Texas Christian University. Upon retirement in 2002, Gutsche moved to Tucson, Arizona and became a visiting scholar at the University of Arizona.

References

1921 births
2018 deaths
20th-century American chemists
21st-century American chemists
Organic chemists
University of Wisconsin–Madison College of Letters and Science alumni
Washington University in St. Louis faculty
Texas Christian University faculty
People from La Grange Park, Illinois
Oberlin College alumni